Tonino Sorrentino (born 12 March 1985 in Melito Irpino) is an Italian association footballer who plays for FC Südtirol.

Career
Sorrentino played a game in UEFA Cup for Parma in 2003–04 season (as B squad player), before left on loan to hometown club Avellino. He scored twice in his European debut.

He returned to Parma in summer 2004, played three time in UEFA Cup, and 5 in Serie A. In 2005–06 season, he left for Catanzaro and Grosseto. At the end of season, Grosseto signed him in joint-ownership bid.

In 2007–08 season, he left on loan again, this time to Perugia and Cavese.

At the end of season, Grosseto bought all of the contract from Parma, but Sorrentino stayed with Cavese.

In January 2010 he left Cavese to join FC Südtirol.

References

General
 FIGC
 Cavese website
 
 

Italian footballers
Italy youth international footballers
Parma Calcio 1913 players
U.S. Avellino 1912 players
U.S. Catanzaro 1929 players
F.C. Grosseto S.S.D. players
A.C. Perugia Calcio players
F.C. Südtirol players
Serie A players
Serie B players
Association football forwards
Sportspeople from the Province of Avellino
1985 births
Living people
Footballers from Campania